Karkum (also Romanized as Karkūm; also known as Dārkūd, Dārkūm, Karkom, Qarah Qom, and Qarqom) is a village in Holunchekan Rural District in the Central District of Qasr-e Qand County, Sistan and Baluchestan Province, Iran. At the 2006 census, its population was 137, in 40 families.

References 

Populated places in Qasr-e Qand County